Ciucsângeorgiu is a commune in Harghita County, Romania. It lies in the Székely Land, an ethno-cultural region in eastern Transylvania.

Component villages
The commune is composed of nine villages:

History 
The village formed part of the Székely seat of Csíkszék, then from 1876 until 1918 to Csík County in the Kingdom of Hungary. After the Treaty of Trianon of 1920, it became part of Romania. In 1940, the Second Vienna Award granted the Northern Transylvania to Hungary and the villages were held by Hungary until 1944. After Soviet occupation, the Romanian administration returned and the commune became officially part of Romania in 1947. Between 1952 and 1960, the commune fell within the Magyar Autonomous Region, between 1960 and 1968 the Mureș-Magyar Autonomous Region. In 1968, the province was abolished, and since then, the commune has been part of Harghita County.

Demographics
At the 2011 census, the commune had a population of 4,839; out of them, 96% were Hungarian, 1.3% were Roma and 0.4% were Romanian. 94% of the commune population are Roman Catholic, 1.6% are Pentecostal, 0.5% are Reformed and 0.4% are Orthodox.

References

Communes in Harghita County
Localities in Transylvania
Székely communities